Sojka Pavilion is a 4,000-seat  multi-purpose arena in Lewisburg, Pennsylvania. It was built in 2003 and is home to the Bucknell University Bison basketball teams, replacing nearby Davis Gym. It is named for Dr. Gary Allan Sojka, a former president of the university who remained at the university as a professor of biology after the end of his term, until his retirement in 2006. It features locker rooms, a hardwood playing surface, concession stands, LED video boards, a team store, and a Jumbotron. 

In 2006, 2011, 2012, 2013, 2017 and 2018, Sojka Pavilion hosted the Patriot League men's basketball tournament championship final game.

See also
 List of NCAA Division I basketball arenas

References

External links
Official website

College basketball venues in the United States
Sports venues in Pennsylvania
Indoor arenas in Pennsylvania
Basketball venues in Pennsylvania
Bucknell Bison men's basketball